Pietro Arese (born 8 October 1999) is an Italian middle-distance runner.

No kinship with the middle-distance runner Franco Arese, former European champion and former president of the Italian Athletics Federation (FIDAL).

Career
His sporting explosion in the winter of 2021, when at the age of 21 he became the Italian indoor champion both on the 1500 m and on the 3000 m, in both cases, an unusual thing, significantly improving his times on the corresponding distances, but outdoors. Thus earning his first call-up to the national team for the 2021 European Indoor Championships.

Achievements
Senior level

National titles
Arese won 3 national championships.
 Italian Athletics Indoor Championships
 1500 m: 2021, 2023
 3000 m: 2021

References

External links

1999 births
Living people
Italian male middle-distance runners
Sportspeople from Turin
Athletics competitors of Fiamme Gialle
Italian Athletics Championships winners
Athletes (track and field) at the 2022 Mediterranean Games
Mediterranean Games competitors for Italy